Harvey Birdman, Attorney at Law is an American animated sitcom that was created by Michael Ouweleen and Erik Richter and aired on Cartoon Network's late night programming block, Adult Swim. The series is about the life and career of Harvey Birdman, an attorney for Sebben & Sebben law firm, who regularly represents various Hanna-Barbera characters.

An early version of the pilot episode originally aired months prior to the launch of Adult Swim on Cartoon Network unannounced on December 30, 2000. It later made its official debut on Adult Swim on September 2, 2001 (the same night the network launched) and ended on July 22, 2007, with a total of 39 episodes, over the course of 4 seasons. The entire series has been made available on DVD, and other forms of home media, including on demand streaming on Hulu. A half-hour long special, entitled Harvey Birdman: Attorney General, premiered on Adult Swim on October 15, 2018.

Series overview

Episodes

Season 1 (2000–03)

Season 2 (2004)
Note: From episode 10 to the end of the series, all episodes were directed by Richard Ferguson-Hull.

Season 3 (2005)

Season 4 (2006–07)

Special (2018)

References

External links

 
 

Lists of American adult animated television series episodes
Lists of American sitcom episodes
Episodes